Crash Bandicoot is a video game franchise originally developed by Naughty Dog as an exclusive for Sony's PlayStation console. It has seen numerous installments created by various developers and published on multiple platforms. The series consists predominantly of platform games, but also includes spin-offs in the kart racing and party game genres. The series was originally produced by Universal Interactive, which later became known as Vivendi Games; in 2007, Vivendi merged with Activision, which currently owns and publishes the franchise.

The games are mostly set on the fictitious Wumpa Islands, an archipelago situated to the south of Australia where humans and mutant animals co-exist, although other locations are common. The protagonist of the series is a genetically enhanced bandicoot named Crash, whose quiet life on the Wumpa Islands is often interrupted by the games' main antagonist, Doctor Neo Cortex, who created Crash and wants him dead as he is a failed experiment. In most games, Crash must defeat Cortex and foil his plans for world domination.

History

1996–2000: PlayStation exclusivity 
After presenting Way of the Warrior to Mark Cerny of Universal Interactive, Naughty Dog was signed on to the company for three additional games. In August 1994, Andy Gavin and Jason Rubin began their move from Boston, Massachusetts to Los Angeles, California. During the trip, Gavin and Rubin decided to create a 3D action-platform game, taking inspiration from 16-bit-era games such as Donkey Kong Country, Mario and Sonic. Because the player would be forced to constantly look at the character's backside, the game was jokingly code-named "Sonic's Ass Game". The basic technology for the game and the Crash Bandicoot series as a whole was created somewhere near Gary, Indiana. The rough game theory was designed near Colorado, Indiana. Soon afterward, Gavin and Rubin discarded their previous game design for Al O. Saurus and Dinestein, a side-scrolling video game based on time travel and scientists genetically merged with dinosaurs. After moving into the Universal Interactive backlot, Gavin and Rubin met with Mark Cerny, discussed the design of the game and made an agreement to go into production. In September 1994, Gavin and Rubin decided to develop their new game for the PlayStation, after which Rubin began character design. In November 1994, Naughty Dog hired Dave Baggett, their first employee and a friend of Gavin's from the Massachusetts Institute of Technology. Together, Gavin and Baggett created the development tool "Game Oriented Object LISP" (GOOL), which would be used to create the characters and gameplay of the game. In January 1995, Rubin became concerned about the programmer-to-artist ratio and hired Bob Rafei and Taylor Kurosaki as additional artists.

Needing a lead character for the game, Naughty Dog recruited artists Charles Zembillas and Joe Pearson and met with them weekly to create the characters and environments of the game, eventually creating a character named "Willy the Wombat". The marketing director of Universal Interactive insisted that the character be named "Wez", "Wuzzles" or "Wizzy the Wombat". On creating the levels for the game, Zembillas and Pearson first sketched each environment, designing and creating additional individual elements later. They aimed for an organic, overgrown look to the game and worked to completely avoid straight lines and 90-degree corners. A Naughty Dog artist sketched every single background object in the game before it was modeled. The artists were tasked with making the best use of textures and reducing the amount of geometry. Dark and light elements were juxtaposed to create visual interest and separate geometry. The Naughty Dog artists would squint when sketching, texturing and playing the levels to make sure they could be played by light value alone. Correct use of color was an important goal for Naughty Dog's artists; for example, mutually accentuating colors were chosen as the theme for the "Lost City" and "Sunset Vista" levels. The interior of Doctor Neo Cortex's castle was designed to reflect Cortex's twisted mind.

After the main character's creation, the team went into three months of developing the game. The game first became functional in April 1995 and became playable in June 1995. The first 3 levels in the game were completed by August 1995. However, they were judged to be too difficult to appear so early in the game and were moved to the game's power plant area. Artist Charlotte Francis joined Naughty Dog at around this time. In September 1995, a videotape of Crash Bandicoot was shown to Sony Computer Entertainment behind closed doors. While playing the game during development, Rubin realized that there were many empty areas in the game due to the PlayStation's inability to process numerous on-screen enemy characters at the same time. Additionally, players were solving the game's puzzles too fast. Rubin soon came up with the idea of a box and putting various symbols on the sides to create puzzles. Breaking these boxes would serve to fill in the boring parts of the levels and give the player additional puzzles. The first "crate" was placed in the game in January 1996, and would become the primary gameplay element of the series. Willy the Wombat's destruction of the crates would eventually lead him to be renamed "Crash Bandicoot". In March 1996, Sony agreed to publish Crash Bandicoot, which went into the alpha stage in April 1996. Crash Bandicoot was first shown at the Electronic Entertainment Expo in May 1996.

Development of Cortex Strikes Back began in October 1996. For the game, Andy Gavin created a new engine and scripting language named "Game Oriented Object LISP 2" (GOOL 2) that was three times faster than the previous game's engine, could handle ten times the animation frames and twice the polygon count. The jungle levels were originally to have featured ground fog, but this was abandoned when magazines and the public began to heavily criticize other developers for using fog to hide polygon count. Sunlight and depth accentuation was experimented with for these levels. Wanting to have some "dirty" locations in the game, Naughty Dog worked in the sewer levels and added color contrast to the levels to show depth and break up the repetitive monotony of the endless sewer pipes. A flat plane z-buffer was created for the game; because the water surfaces and mud in the jungle had to be a flat plane and be exactly flat on the Y-axis, there could be no waves and the subdividing plane could not be at an odd angle. The effect only worked on objects in the foreground and was only used on Crash, some enemies and a few boxes at the same time. The soundtrack of Crash Bandicoot 2: Cortex Strikes Back was provided by Mutato Muzika (consisting of Mark Mothersbaugh and Josh Mancell), while the sound effects were created by Universal Sound Studios (consisting of Mike Gollom, Ron Horwitz and Kevin Spears). The characters were designed by Charles Zembillas of American Exitus, Incorporated. Clancy Brown provided the voice of Doctor Neo Cortex, while Brendan O'Brien voiced the dual role of Doctor N. Gin and Doctor Nitrus Brio and Vicki Winters voiced Coco Bandicoot. The game was unveiled at the Electronic Entertainment Expo in Atlanta, Georgia in June 1997 to a positive response from the game industry. The game went into the alpha stage in August 1997. Around that time, Dan Arey, the lead designer of Gex: Enter the Gecko, joined Naughty Dog and streamlined the level design.

Like the first, the second game was a commercial success, green-lighting a third game. Production of Crash Bandicoot: Warped began in January 1998, with Naughty Dog given only 10½ months to complete the game. Programmers Andy Gavin, Stephen White and Greg Omi created three new gameplay engines for the game. Two of the three new engines were three-dimensional in nature and were created for the airplane and jet-ski levels; the third new engine was created for the motorcycle levels in the style of a driving simulator. The new engines combined make up a third of the game, while the other two-thirds of the game consist of the tweaked engine used in the previous games. Jason Rubin explained that the "classic" engine and game style was preserved due to the success of the previous two games and went on to say that "were we to abandon that style of gameplay, that would mean that we would be abandoning a significant proportion of gamers out there". An arbitrary plane z-buffer was created for the jet-ski and flooded Egyptian hallway levels of the game. To create a completely fluid feel for the water on these levels, an environment map that reflects the sky was fitted onto the surface of the water. A real shadow was given to the Crash character at the request of the Sony Computer Entertainment America producers, who were "sick of that little discus that's following him around." To create an "arcade" experience in the airplane levels and to differentiate them from flight simulators, the enemy planes were programmed to come out in front of the player and give the player ample time to shoot them before they turn around and shoot the player rather than come up behind the player and hit them from behind. The Relic system was introduced to give players a reason to return to the game after it has been completed.

Also in 1998, Tiger Electronics released a series called 99X, each containing a black and white video game as opposed to the LCD games they were commonly known for. These were handhelds fitted with a dot-matrix screen, allowing for a wide variety of backgrounds and gameplay for a single game. Although running a software program stored in ROM, the systems were dedicated consoles, similar to the plug-and-play TV games of the 2000s decade. A Crash Bandicoot game, simply titled Crash Bandicoot, was released as part of this series. Despite its name and being a platformer like its predecessors, it is not an adaptation of nor bears any relation to the 1996 game, instead featuring a plot of its own involving Crash retrieving treasure from a mansion haunted by a ghost named Mr. Crumb and his cronies. This was the first handheld game to be released in the series, as well as the first to include a multiplayer mode.

While initially Naughty Dog was only signed on to make three games, Crash Team Racing was a possible Crash 3 as it started out in production after Crash 2 and the game which was finished first in production would be released first. However, Naughty Dog had already gotten far into the project and decided to finish it and release it. David Baggett produced the game's soundtrack, with Mark Mothersbaugh and Josh Mancell of Mutato Muzika composing the music. Sound effects were created by Mike Gollum, Ron Horwitz and Kevin Spears of Universal Sound Studios. This marked the end of Naughty Dog's Crash Bandicoot games.

With the release of Crash Bash, Universal Interactive's publishing deal with SCE had ended. Crash's prominent status within the video game community prompted the company to make Crash a multiplatform series, giving the series to Mark Cerny and Vicarious Visions to develop two separate but connected games.

2001–2006: Transition to third party 
Crash Bandicoot: The Wrath of Cortex was originally to be designed by Cerny and published by Sony. After a falling-out between Universal and the two entities, developer Traveller's Tales was forced to alter the game from a free-roaming title to a standard Crash title. Traveller's Tales had to begin development of the game from scratch and were given only twelve months to complete it. The game received mixed reviews but made the Greatest Hits lineup due to strong sales.

The following year, Universal would have Vicarious Visions release their first Crash Bandicoot game, a handheld exclusive called The Huge Adventure was developed by Vicarious Visions and released to favourable reviews. The game would be noted for being extremely similar to Naughty Dog's Crash Bandicoot 3. This would warrant a sequel, N-Tranced, which would also be met to similar reception. During this time a subsidy of Traveller's Tales—Traveller's Tales Oxford Studio were developing a new Crash game for console. This game was to be Crash Nitro Kart but due to unknown circumstances Universal moved development of Crash Nitro Kart over to Vicarious Visions. Traveller's Tales Oxford Studio then moved on to their next project, Crash Bandicoot Evolution.

Crash Bandicoot Evolution was set to create a new form of gameplay for Crash, with the game planned to be a platformer/RPG with many different elements planned for the game; it eventually became Crash Twinsanity. Although Traveller's Tales planned on creating a Crash Bandicoot game titled Cortex Chaos and a sequel to Crash Twinsanity, Universal never picked up the games, effectively cancelling them. Vicarious Visions's fourth and final game was Crash Bandicoot Purple: Ripto's Rampage for the Game Boy Advance, a crossover with the Spyro franchise and companion game to Spyro Orange: The Cortex Conspiracy.

Although Cortex Chaos and the sequel to Crash Twinsanity were cancelled, Traveller's Tales was nonetheless commissioned to develop one final Crash Bandicoot game. It was to be a kart racing game titled Crash Clash Racing. However, Traveller's Tales was taken off the project as it was given to Radical Entertainment. The new studio proceeded to change the project into an entirely new game, keeping only two core ideas, clashing and fusion. The game marked the first game published under Universal's Sierra Entertainment brand, and the first game to use Radical's Titanium Engine, receiving the title Crash Tag Team Racing.

The following year Crash Boom Bang! was released on July 20, 2006. This was the first Crash game to be developed by a Japanese video game studio called Dimps. This was also the first game to exclusively feature a Japanese voice cast in all regional versions of the game.

2007–2010: Redesign 
Development on Crash of the Titans, Radical's second title, began after the completion of Crash Tag Team Racing. The graphics of the Wii version of the game was one of Radical Entertainment's main focuses in the game's development, with Radical stating that the Wii has "a lot of horsepower under the hood" and expressing their desire to make full use of it. They also considered implementing a feature to connect the Wii to DS during gameplay, but stopped due to technical issues and time limitations. The Xbox 360 version got a few extra months of development time to improve its graphics before setting a final release date.

While the game was being developed, the title's main character, Crash Bandicoot, became the new mascot of the Leukemia & Lymphoma Society's "School and Youth" programs in an effort to promote the battle against blood cancer. In a bid to further promote the game, a Hummer was painted with imagery from the game and displayed at the Annual Balloon Fiesta in Bristol, United Kingdom. A "Monster Edition" of the game was released exclusively in Europe on October 12, 2007 for the PlayStation 2. This special edition of the game features "Making-of" videos, water-on tattoos, game hints, a cheat code list, and the game's E3 and theatrical trailers in multiple languages. Due to its "mild cartoon violence and language", the game received a PG rating from the BBFC.

Development on Crash: Mind over Mutant, Radical's third and final Crash title, began immediately after the completion of Crash of the Titans. The idea of preserving a Titan for later use came from the play testing sessions of Crash of the Titans, in which the testers were found to be reluctant to leave the Titans behind after an epic battle was won. Fans of the series were also a source of inspiration for Crash: Mind over Mutant, having such wishes as a free-roaming environment, Coco Bandicoot being a playable character and the return of the character Doctor Nitrus Brio. Full camera control was considered for the game, but was rejected for graphical reasons and to avoid having to insert a split-screen view in the cooperation mode. Online gameplay was also considered as a feature in the finished game, but was omitted due to the brief development schedule. Coco Bandicoot as a playable character was omitted from the PlayStation 2 version of the game due to her distinct animations taking up much of the console's memory. The Wii version of Crash: Mind over Mutant was created first, with the graphics scaled up for the Xbox 360, and scaled down for the PlayStation 2.

In 2010, rumors appeared that Radical Entertainment was developing a fourth Crash Bandicoot title, under the name Crash Landed, but due to large layoffs in the studio, the game was cancelled with all remaining developers put to work on Prototype 2. The DS edition of this game would be in development by Renegade Kid for approximately two weeks before similarly being cancelled by Activision. High Impact Games was developing a reboot of Crash Team Racing for PlayStation 3, Xbox 360 and Wii, but the game was cancelled by Activision before the initial prototype. Several ideas for the game eventually made it into DreamWorks Super Star Kartz.

2011–2016: Hiatus 
On a Kotaku interview with then-Activision CEO Eric Hirshberg regarding the future of the Crash series, he said, "I don't have anything official to announce, but I can speak as an individual, I love Crash Bandicoot. Those were some of my favorite video games growing up. And I would love to find a way to bring him back, if we could." Andy Gavin, co-creator of Crash Bandicoot, has said that he would love to see a HD version of the marsupial's first four games, or even a full-blown reboot. Jason Rubin, co-creator of Crash Bandicoot, said he was hopeful that Activision would "bring Crash back to their glory days and that the character is still very dear to fans between 18–49 years". A new design of Crash Bandicoot was spotted in a photo from the Vicarious Visions's studio, raising rumors that a new game might have been in development, though this was later confirmed to be concept art from a previous Crash Bandicoot cancelled game.

In June 2013, co-creator Andy Gavin suggested ways to revitalize the series. "Crash needs a total reboot. There's an opportunity to reset the history, and go back to his creation story and the original conflict with Cortex. In that context, you could reprise classic Crash 1 and 2's settings and villains. It would make sense to use a more modern, free-roaming style. I would concentrate on Looney Tunes-esque animation and really addictive action. That's what we did with the original Crash, and there's no reason it couldn't be done today. Given the current Crash games, people forget that he was once cool. Our Crash had a certain whimsical edge to him. Sure, it was goofy—but it wasn't dumb.".

In November 2013, rumours began circulating that Sony bought the rights to the franchise from Activision. Speculations were fueled after the release of PlayStation 4's #4ThePlayers campaign, featuring a road sign with a silhouette of Crash, and an arrow pointing towards the orange diamond logo of Sony Computer Entertainment. Publications such as IGN reported that Crash was removed from Activision's official website, which seemed to add further credibility to the rumor. However, shortly after, this was proven false, as an Activision representative told Game Informer that "[Activision still owns] Crash Bandicoot and we continue to explore ways in which we could bring the beloved series to life".

In July 2014, Sony Computer Entertainment CEO Andrew House revealed that reviving the Crash Bandicoot series was something that they have been thinking about, saying "It's never off the table.", and Naughty Dog also revealed through an IGN interview the possibility that they may revive both series of Crash Bandicoot as well as Jak & Daxter. In January 2015, however, Naughty Dog's Josh Scherr stated in an interview with Game Informer that Naughty Dog did not miss working on either series and had no intention of bringing them back to life. Despite this, Naughty Dog co-president Evan Wells stated that the company would love to return to Crash Bandicoot but did not see it as viable.

On December 5, 2015, rumors of a possible Crash Bandicoot return flared up once again when SIE Worldwide Studios Chairman and SCEA President and CEO Shawn Layden appeared onstage at PlayStation Experience wearing a Crash Bandicoot shirt. Layden, however, never mentioned the series at the event, and has yet to address why he wore the shirt. In February 2016, a new Crash game appeared to be on the horizon when NECA Director of Product Development Randy Falk stated in an interview with YouTuber Pixel Dan that the company had "a lot of stuff going on with Sony" before mentioning that "I see they're bringing Crash Bandicoot back, so there's some great stuff there." Shortly after, however, an NECA representative clarified with GameSpot that Falk's comments were misunderstood, and that Falk was only speaking of a hypothetical return of the series after seeing a fan-made Crash art just before being interviewed.

Naughty Dog's 2016 game Uncharted 4: A Thief's End features protagonist Nathan Drake playing a level from the original Crash Bandicoot, further adding to the rumor that a return for the series was imminent. Speculation was fueled even further when it was discovered that Activision's legal ownership of the franchise was not mentioned anywhere in the game's credits, sparking rumors that the franchise had been purchased by Sony. Lex Lang, the then-most-recent voice actor of Dr. Neo Cortex, also hinted on Facebook that he was asked to reprise his role. However, shortly after, the rumors and speculations were derailed when Sony VP of Publisher Relations Adam Boyes confirmed on Twitter that Activision still owns the rights to the franchise, and Lang clarified that he was not teasing a Crash Bandicoot revival, and that he had not been asked to return to the series, but would be open to potentially lending his voice to a new Crash game in the future.

2016–present: Revival 
At E3 2016 during Sony's press conference, after years of rumors, speculation and outcry, Crash Bandicoot finally made his official return when it was announced, in a timed partnership with Activision, that the first three games from the original PlayStation would be remade from the ground up. Crash would also be a playable character in Activision's then-upcoming toys-to-life game Skylanders: Imaginators, released on October 16, 2016. It was announced at Gamescom 2016 that Dr. Neo Cortex would also be playable in Imaginators, and that a Crash-themed level was created for the game, "Thumpin' Wumpa Islands". The Crash Bandicoot N. Sane Trilogy, a collection of remasters of the first three games in the series, was developed by Vicarious Visions and released for the PlayStation 4 on June 30, 2017. Vicarious Visions had also expressed interest in making a new Crash Bandicoot game following the N. Sane Trilogys release. Two additional levels were added as post-launch downloadable content, and the N. Sane Trilogy was eventually ported to the Nintendo Switch, Xbox One, and Microsoft Windows on June 29, 2018 with assistance from Skylanders developer Toys for Bob.

During an interview with Metro Game Central, Vicarious Visions producer Kara Massie refused to rule out the possibility of a remaster of Crash Team Racing for the PlayStation 4. Massie has also acknowledged that she was repeatedly asked about revivals of Crash Team Racing and Spyro the Dragon by fans. At the time, Massie had not confirmed if the games would be in the works following the release of N. Sane Trilogy. A remake of Crash Team Racing was teased on December 4, 2018 when then-PlayStation Access presenter Hollie Bennett shared an image of two orange fuzzy dice on Twitter, with an announcement to come two days later at the 2018 Game Awards. The remaster, titled Crash Team Racing Nitro-Fueled, was formally revealed at the awards show and released on June 21, 2019 for the PlayStation 4, Xbox One, and Nintendo Switch with no current plans for a PC version. The remaster was developed from the ground up by Beenox, another subsidiary of Activision, and also incorporates remastered characters, tracks & karts from Crash Nitro Kart (previously developed by Vicarious Visions) as well as remastered characters, karts, and skins from Crash Tag Team Racing. The game also features retro-themed content exclusive to the PlayStation 4 version and monthly timed Grand Prix races with additional unlockable characters at no extra charge.

On June 21, 2020, the official Crash Bandicoot social media channels posted a teaser revealing the title of the next Crash Bandicoot game, Crash Bandicoot 4: It's About Time; the game was released for PlayStation 4 and Xbox One on October 2, 2020, and for Nintendo Switch, PlayStation 5, and Xbox Series X and Series S on March 12, 2021. Crash Bandicoot: On the Run!, an endless running game for Android and iOS, was announced in July 2020, after soft launching on Android in select regions in Southeast Asia on April 22, 2020 under the title Crash Bandicoot Mobile. The game, developed and published by King in collaboration with Activision, was released on March 25, 2021.

In December 2022, multiplayer game Crash Team Rumble was announced for the PlayStation 4, PlayStation 5, Xbox One and Xbox Series X/S, at The Game Awards. The game is set for a 2023 release.

Common gameplay elements 
Crash Bandicoot is primarily a platforming series. The goal of each level is to guide Crash from the beginning to the end, travelling either into the screen, towards the player or left and right in a side-scrolling manner. Several levels place Crash in unique situations which require the use of motorbikes, jet skis, submarines and various wild animals to complete the level.

In the original Crash Bandicoot, Crash's move-set is rather limited; he can run, jump and spin his way through treacherous environments and hostile creatures. Cortex Strikes Back introduces several new moves for Crash to utilize, including a high jump, high spin jump, body slam and slide attack. Warped expands on this by awarding the player with new abilities after each boss is defeated, which was carried over to The Wrath of Cortex. The player can also spin and slide at the same time when pressing the right buttons.

Collectibles 
The most common collectible in the series is Wumpa Fruit, which is found on the main path of most levels, as well as inside most crates. Collecting 100 Wumpa Fruits will award the player an extra life. Wumpa Fruit takes on other uses in most spin-off titles, such as restoring health in certain Crash Bash levels and increasing weapon power in Crash Team Racing. In recent titles, Wumpa Fruit is used to replenish Crash's health, with Mojo effectively replacing it as the new main collectible item. By collecting Aku Aku masks, Crash can be protected from harm from most enemies and obstacles (though certain elements such as bottomless pits will cause him to lose a life regardless). Crash can collect up to two masks for two extra hits of damage, with an additional mask granting him temporary invincibility. When Crash collects two masks, Aku Aku will turn gold in most games; however, in Crash Twinsanity, Aku Aku will sparkle.

The other major recurring valuables Crash finds on his adventures include Gems and Crystals. Most Gems in the series are won by breaking open every crate in a level. Starting with Cortex Strikes Back, an additional five colored Gems can be obtained by completing special tasks or finding hidden areas. Crash Twinsanity contains six colored Gems per level, most of which are earned by solving a small puzzle. Crystals, which play a key role in the plot of most Crash games following Cortex Strikes Back, are usually required to make progress through most games. Relics, first introduced in Warped, are earned in Time Trial modes, with more valuable relics earned for higher times. In the original game, players can also obtain two keys after completing two Cortex bonus rounds, which are used to unlock two extra levels.

Crates 
Crates come in several varieties and can be found in abundance across Crash's world. Most crates will assist the player's journey through the game, providing Wumpa Fruit, additional hit points in the form of Aku Aku masks and extra lives. In most games, players will be awarded a gem if they break all the crates in a level.

TNT and Nitro Crates are the only boxes that can damage Crash. TNT Crates have a three-second fuse when jumped on, but Nitro Crates will explode instantly upon any contact with Crash or anything else that runs into them. Switch Boxes (distinguished by an exclamation mark) are used to make previously invisible crates appear. A green Switch Box will detonate all Nitro Crates in the level.

Crates marked with a "C" are checkpoints that Crash will return to if he is killed during play. Locked Crates are protected by a metal casing that can only be destroyed with Crash's body slam move, while Spring Crates allow him to reach high up areas by bouncing on them. Slot Boxes rapidly switch between multiple types of crates, and if they are not broken in time, will become metallic and indestructible. Time Boxes are a special crate found exclusively in Time Trial mode. They will freeze the clock for the number of seconds displayed on the box, increasing the player's chance of beating the time trial.

Structure 
The original Crash Bandicoot uses a fairly linear structure in which Crash clears through levels on a map, with some areas accessible by locating gems. Beginning with Cortex Strikes Back, the game usually takes place in a hub world called a Warp Room, with levels divided up into sets of five. To progress, the player must find and collect a Crystal within each of the stages, which can be played in any order, before facing the boss of each room. From Twinsanity onwards, the games took a more free-roaming approach, with Crash travelling various areas on foot.

Music 
Numerous composers have contributed music to the Crash Bandicoot series. Mutato Muzika's Josh Mancell was responsible for the music of the first four games. After the fourth game, numerous other composers were responsible for the music in other games. Steve Duckworth composed music for Crash Bash, Andy Blythe and Marten Joustra for The Wrath of Cortex, Ashif Hakik and Todd Masten for Crash Nitro Kart and Spiralmouth composing a cappella for Twinsanity. The music for Tag Team Racing was composed by both Spiralmouth and Marc Baril, while Crash of the Titans and Mind Over Mutant were composed by Baril alone.

Developers and publishers 
The first four Crash Bandicoot games were developed by Naughty Dog. Bash was developed by Eurocom. The Wrath of Cortex and Twinsanity were developed by Traveller's Tales and its division Traveller's Tales Oxford, respectively. The Huge Adventure (Crash Bandicoot XS in Europe), 2: N-Tranced, Nitro Kart, Purple: Ripto's Rampage (Crash Bandicoot Fusion in Europe) and N. Sane Trilogy have all been developed by Vicarious Visions. Tag Team Racing, Crash of the Titans and Mind over Mutant were developed by Radical Entertainment. Boom Bang! was developed by Dimps. Team Racing Nitro-Fueled was developed by Beenox. It's About Time was developed by Toys for Bob.

The first five Crash titles were published worldwide by Sony Computer Entertainment and produced by Universal Interactive Studios. Wrath of Cortex up until Twinsanity were published by Universal Interactive (now the defunct Vivendi Games). Tag Team Racing, Boom Bang! and Crash of the Titans were published by Sierra Entertainment. All games since Mind over Mutant have been published by Activision.

From Wrath of Cortex until Nitro Kart, Konami handled publishing and distribution for the Japanese market and also co-published the worldwide release of The Wrath of Cortex for PS2. The Japanese versions of N. Sane Trilogy were published by Sony Interactive Entertainment for PS4 and by Sega of Japan for Nintendo Switch; Sega subsequently handled Team Racing Nitro-Fueled for Japan as well.

Other media

Manga 
In 1998, Coro Coro Comics developed a manga series titled Crash Bandicoot—Dansu! de Jump! na Daibōken, loosely based on the events of Crash Bandicoot 2: Cortex Strikes Back. The series was drawn and produced by Ari Kawashima, with only two manga volumes being published to date, leaving the total number of comics unknown.

Animation 
During the production of Crash Bandicoot, a pair of cutscenes featuring hand-drawn animation were produced by Universal Animation Studios to serve as the game's intro and outro, as well as act as source material for a potential animated series if the game was well-received and commercially successful. The hand-drawn cutscenes were dropped after Sony Computer Entertainment picked up Crash Bandicoot for publication, as Sony desired to push the PlayStation's 3D polygonal graphics. The cutscenes were uploaded to YouTube by producer David Siller in 2015.

In 2007, The Animation Picture Company produced four web-short films, to promote the game Crash of the Titans, titled Crash Bandicoot: No Use Crying, Crash Bandicoot Monster Truck, Crash Bandicoot – Titan Idol and Crash Bandicoot – Have Another, all lasting for about three minutes. These are available for free download on the Xbox 360 video service or are available to watch on the web, originally available for viewing on the Crash Bandicoot official website.

Crash also makes a guest appearance in the Skylanders Academy animated series. At the end of the episode "The Skylands Are Falling!", due to the actions of the Skylanders, Crash is inadvertently pulled through a dimensional rift while battling Cortex, ending up in the Skylands. The episode "Crash Landing" features Crash allying with Spyro and the Skylanders to recover the dark relic needed to return him to the Wumpa Islands. Crash's appearance in Skylanders Academy differs from his appearance in Skylanders: Imaginators, but unlike other appearances, he is capable of speaking full sentences with an Australian accent. The third season of Skylanders Academy brought the character back starring Rhys Darby, who replaces Eric Rogers due to stepping down as a showrunner. Crash returned in the episode "Days of Future Crash", in which Dark Spyro and Eruptor brought him to the future for different reasons, messing up their timeline in the process. After retrieving a new time travel device, they sent him home. Crash appeared again in the season finale, "Raiders of the Lost Arkus, Part II", where he and Coco (voiced by Tara Strong) were brought from the Wumpa Islands by the Skylanders and Flynn to stop Kaos from destroying the Core of Light. Coco's appearance in the series seems to be a combination of her Titans and Mind over Mutant design: like Crash, she also speaks in an Australian accent and seems to not only be capable of building her own weapons but able to control technology to the point of utilizing a thought-controlled boomerang in battle.

On January 13, 2021, test footage from a scrapped Crash Bandicoot series was leaked on Reddit. The series would have been a co-production between Activision and Amazon Studios. The series was allegedly canceled due to a script dispute.

In science 
The earliest-known bandicoot fossil from the Miocene of Australia has been given the binomial Crash bandicoot.

Reception 

The Crash Bandicoot series has been a commercial success. As of 2007, the series altogether has sold over 40 million units worldwideand grossed over $1 billion. According to Gamasutra, the first Crash Bandicoot game had sold 6.8 million units as of November 2003, making it the tenth-best-selling PlayStation game of all time. Cortex Strikes Back sold 3.85 million units in the U.S., while Warped sold 3.74 million. The last 2 games on the PlayStation console, Crash Team Racing and Crash Bash, sold 1.9 and 1.1 million units in the U.S., respectively. Crash Bandicoot: The Wrath of Cortex has sold 1.56 million units in the U.S.

On February 12, 2019, Activision announced in a press release for its "4th quarter and 2018 Financial Results", that N. Sane Trilogy has sold-in over 10 million units since its initial release in 2017.

The Crash Bandicoot series is one of the few Western video game series to find blockbuster success in Japan. Cortex Strikes Back and Warped sold 1.3 and 1.4 million units in the country, respectively, while the PlayStation 2 version of Wrath of Cortex sold 212,000 units.

References

External links 
 
 

 
Activision Blizzard franchises
Video game franchises introduced in 1996
Video games set on fictional islands
Activision games
Naughty Dog games
Video game franchises